Hanoi BRT or Hanoi Bus Rapid Transit is a transit bus system with large roadway shelters in Hanoi, Vietnam that opened on 31 December 2016, that began as a pilot project.  

The Kim Ma Station in Dong Da District and Yen Nghia station in Ha Dong District route runs 14.5-km route, albeit with problems of traffic separation and heavy usage during rush hours, meanwhile very under-utilised during other hours. Nevertheless, a second line is planned.

References 

Rapid transit in Vietnam
BRT
Proposed public transport in Asia